or  is the administrative centre of Sørreisa Municipality in Troms og Finnmark county, Norway. The village (also known as Straumen) is located at the eastern end of the Reisafjorden, an arm off of the main Solbergfjorden, and north of the lake Reisvatnet.

Sørreisa is the location of the intersection of Norwegian County Road 86 and Norwegian County Road 84. Straumen Chapel is the main church for the village.

References

Sørreisa
Villages in Troms